The First League of the Federation of Bosnia and Herzegovina in the 2010-11 season is the 16th edition of the second level football league of Bosnia and Herzegovina.

League table

External links
soccerway.com; standings and results

First League of the Federation of Bosnia and Herzegovina seasons
2010–11 in Bosnia and Herzegovina football
Bos